Mick Donohue (2 August 1917 – 15 September 1990) was an Australian rules footballer who played with Collingwood in the Victorian Football League (VFL).

Notes

External links 

		
Profile on Collingwood Forever

1917 births
1990 deaths
Australian rules footballers from Victoria (Australia)
Collingwood Football Club players